Barracuda is a supervillain appearing in American comic books published by Marvel Comics. He is an enemy of the Punisher. Created by Garth Ennis and Goran Parlov, the character first appeared in The Punisher vol. 7 #31 (May 2006). Barracuda is depicted as a cheerfully optimistic and sadistic mercenary and gangster of great physical strength and endurance who commits various atrocities such as rape, mass murder, kidnapping and cannibalism.

Publication history
The character made his first appearance in The Punisher vol. 7 #31 (May 2006), and was created by Garth Ennis and Goran Parlov.

In a panel at the 2008 Philadelphia Wizard World comic book convention, Garth Ennis stated that the basis for Barracuda was Stagger Lee, a folk song about "a large terrifying man and the terrifying things he does to people".

Barracuda was introduced in a story-arc that lasted from The Punisher vol. 7 #31 to #36. This was to be the character's sole appearance, though at the urging of his editor, Ennis had Barracuda survive the story; this led to Barracuda starring in the five-issue miniseries The Punisher Presents: Barracuda, then being killed off in a storyline that spanned The Punisher vol. 7 #50-54. Barracuda was then featured, via flashbacks to his time in South America in the 1980s, in Fury: MAX #10-12.

Fictional character biography
Barracuda was born to an African-American father and Biracial mother of Black, French and Irish descent in Boynton Beach, Florida and grew up in Boca Raton, as the eldest of two brothers and a sister. His father served in the 827th Tank Destroyer Battalion during World War II. An abusive alcoholic, his father burned Barracuda's hand on a grill while telling him to be "hard as the world itself" the night before abandoning his family.

Barracuda cared for his brother and sister for some time. His brother died and his sister became a prostitute and drug addict.

He got into a fight in elementary school where he shoved his thumbs into a classmate's eyes. After castrating a would-be attacker while in a youth detention center, Barracuda was recruited by the U.S. Army. As a Green Beret, Barracuda's A-team helped the CIA install Leopoldo Luna, a South American dictator in the 1980s. He was also responsible for drug-running in Nicaragua to fund the Contras and committed atrocities against local villages to ensure no resistance; when Colonel Nick Fury investigated, Barracuda humiliated him by making it clear that the CIA and Congress would bury any report, as it implicated too many people. The team went AWOL in Central America after that, though Fury was able to find and attack him five years later. According to his recollection, in another mission in Africa he engaged in cannibalism to prove his masculinity.

After leaving the military, he became a feared gangster. At one point he was arrested at the site of a gangland massacre. He had been snorting lines of cocaine off a severed head. He spent time in jail afterward where he struck a profitable partnership with Harry Ebbing, a corrupt and violent CEO.

Fighting the Punisher
Years later Ebbing hires him to assassinate the Punisher, who is investigating Ebbing's corporation, Dynaco (a parody of Enron). Ebbing plans to sabotage Florida's power grid for profit. The Punisher wishes to stop this plan because it would result in the deaths of many innocent people.

During his fight with the Punisher, Barracuda loses an eye and the fingers on his right hand. Although Barracuda wins the fight and could easily kill his opponent then and there, he takes the Punisher out to sea so he can watch him be killed by sharks. When the Punisher informs him that he has lost the chance to have his fingers reattached (by putting them on ice without using a plastic bag, since direct ice contact kills the nerve endings), Barracuda simply laughs at his own carelessness. He tosses the Punisher overboard, along with Horace, a local gangster that had wronged him. Barracuda thinks a great white had eaten them both. The Punisher survives and escapes by hanging onto the boat.

Barracuda becomes deeply involved with Dynaco and the affairs of the CEO's mistress and his right-hand man Dermot. The plan is to set Dermot up as the new CEO during a shareholder fishing trip. Dynaco's plans, leaked to the media, result in the CEO committing suicide. Dermot ends up talking with the Punisher over the radio. With the full backing of the shareholders Dermot states they can do what they want; the Punisher cannot touch them.

The Punisher sinks the boat; everyone on board is eaten by sharks (the crew were handpicked Dynaco employees who had been in on the plan). Barracuda tries to come aboard Frank's boat, only to be shot at point blank range. Like Frank, he survives by hanging on to the boat.

Miniseries
An undetermined amount of time later, Barracuda is approached by "Big Chris" Angelone, an Italian Mafia boss whose looks and speech patterns strongly resemble Christopher Walken. Angelone has been feuding with Leopoldo Luna about the price of cocaine, so he has decided that his 20-year-old hemophiliac son Oswald will kill Luna with Barracuda's assistance. He does not know Barracuda is an old ally of Luna's. Barracuda immediately betrays Angelone and has Luna take custody of Oswald to blackmail the gangster. He also betrays Luna by sleeping with his wife Wanda and then calls an old transvestite Green Beret buddy Fifty for backup (whom Luna begins sleeping with, not knowing Fifty is a man).

Barracuda also seems to display genuine fondness and concern for Oswald, beyond what would be necessary for the role he wants Oswald to play. He refers to Oswald as "Hemo", encourages him to be more assertive and outgoing, and does not hesitate to risk his life to save Oswald during a gunfight, being wounded in the process. After this, Oswald sincerely thanks Barracuda for saving him.

Barracuda has set a complex scheme into motion in order to obtain the money he needs to get revenge on the Punisher. He announces to Luna's inner-circle that he intends to kill the dictator and put Wanda in his place, kill Angelone and put Oswald in his place, restart the cocaine trade between the two factions and get an American reconstruction firm (represented by an accountant he knew in prison) to start up work in Santa Morricone. One of the circle reveals this plan to Luna and he invites Barracuda and Fifty on a helicopter trip to the local volcano, planning to kill them; Barracuda salvages the situation by getting Fifty to show off his penis, causing the dictator to leap out of the helicopter to his doom.

Meanwhile, Angelone, angry at being betrayed and humiliated, has been trying to launch a coup in Santa Morricone and successfully swings part of the army to his side. Barracuda and Fifty have to fight their way into the presidential palace to grab Oswald and Wanda and then flee back to the helicopter, but Fifty is gunned down in the second half of the plan and he remains behind to cover their retreat. (To his face, Barracuda seems stoically upset about this, but grins and calls his old comrade "dumbass" when out of earshot.) They escape in the helicopter and when Angelone (who had grabbed the landing gear) rises up to get his revenge, Oswald shoots his father dead. He and Barracuda celebrate his becoming a "hardcore motherfucking gangster!"

Barracuda then gives Oswald a friendly pat on the back, which due to his hemophilia kills him. Due to the helicopter not having enough supplies, Barracuda and Wanda are left floating in the Pacific Ocean in a boat with no food or equipment. It is strongly hinted that he is going to cannibalize her.

Long Cold Dark
While formulating a plan to get his revenge on the Punisher, Barracuda receives information from an unknown source that leads him to the home of Yorkie Mitchell, Castle's British friend and former SAS and MI6 agent (retired after the Punisher's "Man of Stone" story arc). After interrogating and killing Yorkie and his wife, Barracuda stumbles across some startling and very useful information; unbeknownst to the Punisher, he has a very young daughter, the result of a tryst between him and now deceased CIA agent Kathryn O'Brien. The baby is in the care of O'Brien's sister and brother-in-law in La Jolla, San Diego, California. Barracuda travels to La Jolla and kidnaps the child from a day care center, killing a worker in the process.

Barracuda returns to New York in order to draw the Punisher into a trap. He secretly sets up a meeting between several criminal organizations in a high rise hotel, knowing full well that such a meeting would attract the Punisher. Barracuda is not at this meeting himself; in fact the criminals are totally unaware of who set up the meeting in the first place. Frank, who is hiding in the ceiling, plans to strike amongst the confusion when he realizes that the entire place, including his own location, has been wired with explosives. Barracuda then steps off an elevator into the meeting and massacres the entire group (with intentions of taking over their businesses once he has finished with the Punisher). Frank joins the fray in order to escape the explosives. The Punisher is the only survivor of the massacre, to Barracuda's delight. He subdues Frank Castle and leaves on a zip line.

When the Punisher awakes, he finds himself bound to a chair. Barracuda gloats to him about his plan and reveals his daughter to him. An enraged Punisher breaks his bonds and attacks Barracuda, biting off his left cheek. Barracuda stabs the Punisher in the side and tosses him through the window. The Punisher lands on the hood of a police car and is arrested and hospitalized. Seeking treatment for his own injuries, Barracuda disappears with Frank's daughter.

Frank convinces his doctor that Barracuda will come for him and kill many people in the hospital. The doctor assists in his escape from police custody; he uses stimulants so Frank can walk. Later, using his own drugs, Frank travels to California to try to head off Barracuda. When he arrives he confronts Barracuda at the home of O'Brien's sister to rescue Sarah. Barracuda seemingly kills the child but it is a fake meant to disorient Frank. It does not work. Frank subdues the man and tortures the location of Sarah out of him. The child is in a car parked out in the woods.

As Frank tries to deal with Sarah's car-seat being booby trapped, Barracuda re-awakens and grabs a gun. He is wounded several times but pursues Frank into a nearby, empty elementary school. Frank loses his three front teeth but Barracuda loses his nose. His hands follow, then his entire head is blown off with his own gun. Sarah is returned safely to her adopted mother.

In the next arc, "Valley Forge, Valley Forge", it is revealed that Barracuda was sent by the U.S. military generals who organized the military operation in the arc "Mother Russia" to silence the Punisher.

Powers and abilities

Barracuda has been trained by the U.S. Army Special Forces. He is a trained armed and unarmed combattant. He is a trained hand-to-hand combattant and is trained in swimming combat. Barracuda is a trained sniper and infantryman. He also has extensive knowledge in medicine and field surgery.

Additionally, Barracuda's equipments include bulletproof vests, military explosive weaponry, such as C-4, grenades, and land mines, assault weaponry like handguns and machine guns, hood knives, and a machete.

Reception

Critical reception 
Devin Friend of Screen Rant asserted, "Far and away the most popular villain from the Punisher MAX comics, Barracuda has become one of the most iconic enemies that Frank Castle has faced. A giant of a man whose massive stature is almost as terrifying as his evil heart, he is one of The Punisher's few opponents who survived to fight multiple times." Grant DeArmitt of CBR.com ranked Barracuda 3rd in their "Punisher Villains Ranked: The 10 Worst Frank Castle Ever Faced" list. Ewan Paterson of WhatCulture ranked Barracuda 5th in their "10 Messed Up Marvel Villains You Won't Believe Exist" list.

Other versions
The Punisher series Barracuda debuted in is set outside the eponymous character's primary continuity, taking place in a parallel universe known as "Earth-200111."

Eminem/The Punisher 
Barracuda is hired by the Parents Music Resource Center to assassinate Eminem, whom he was childhood friends with. He captures both Eminem and the Punisher, but is killed when the former escapes, acquires a chainsaw, and butchers him with it.

Marvel Noir
In Punisher Noir, Barracuda is a Prohibition-era enforcer of Bumpy Johnson, specializing in wrecking nightclubs rivaling those of his employer. He, Jigsaw, and the Russian are hired to kill Frank Castelione, a grocer who had defied mob boss Dutch Schultz. Years later, Barracuda is attacked by Frank's son, the Punisher, while on a date at Coney Island. The Punisher subdues Barracuda by blowing up a ferris wheel, ties him to another ride, and tries to threaten him into revealing who helped him and Jigsaw kill Frank. Barracuda refuses to divulge any information, and dies laughing when the Punisher activates the ride he is attached to, which rips Barracuda in half.

Space: Punisher
Barracuda is as an aquatic extraterrestrial, and a drug dealer with ties to the Six-Fingered Hand. The Punisher tracks Barracuda down to his safe house on the planet Aquarion, wounds him, and forces him into revealing who the Capos of the Six-Fingered Hand are by withholding the device Barracuda needs to breathe while on dry land. The Punisher's interrogation of Barracuda is then interrupted by a trio of hitmen (Sabretooth, Deadpool, and the Leader) sent by Doctor Octopus. The assassins prepare to kill Barracuda and the Punisher, but are themselves killed by the Hulk, who was drawn to the safe house by sonic blasts emitted by the Leader. The Punisher escapes, and Barracuda is left to the mercy of the Hulk, muttering, "Uhhh, man... Those dirty $%^&! Look what they done to my crib! Those punk mutha--Um... except you dog. You made the place look better. Wouldn't change a thing. Heh".

Marvel Universe
A version of Barracuda appears in the regular Earth-616 Marvel Universe in the Punisher Vs. Barracuda 5-issue miniseries by Ed Brisson.

In other media

Film 
 In September 2008, Ray Stevenson and Lionsgate were planning a sequel to Punisher: War Zone, where Barracuda would have appeared. At the 2008 San Diego Comic-Con, when Stevenson was asked if he signed on for more Punisher, he said, "If I had my wish, it's going to run and run. It's up to the fan base. If this works, we get to do it all again". After the first film was not received well by audiences, the rights for the characters eventually reverted to Marvel.

Video games 
 Barracuda is a playable character in the PlayStation Network exclusive game The Punisher: No Mercy, released in 2009.

References

External links
 Barracuda at Marvel Wiki
 Barracuda at Comic Vine
 

Fictional amputees
Fictional assassins in comics
Fictional cannibals
Fictional cocaine users
Fictional gangsters
Fictional kidnappers
Fictional rapists
Fictional United States Army Special Forces personnel
Fictional Nicaraguan Revolution veterans
Fictional mass murderers
Fictional mercenaries in comics
Fictional murdered people
Marvel Comics martial artists
Marvel Comics male supervillains
Marvel Comics military personnel
Punisher characters
Fictional characters missing an eye
Characters created by Garth Ennis
Fictional African-American people
Fictional characters from Florida
Comics characters introduced in 2006
Fictional rampage and spree killers
Fictional murderers of children
Fictional torturers and interrogators